Garegin Khazhak (also Karekin Khajag, ; 6 October 1867–1915) was an Armenian journalist, writer, political activist and educator. A member of the Armenian Revolutionary Federation, Khajag traveled around the world to help support revolutionary activity. During his life, Khajag was imprisoned four times. He became a professor and a principal in several Armenian schools throughout the region. In 1915, Karekin Khajag was arrested and subsequently killed during the Armenian genocide.

Life

Karekin Khajag was born Karekin Chakalian on 6 October 1867 in Alexandropol within the Russian Empire (present-day Gyumri, Armenia). He was called Chakal Oghli (Turkish: son of Chakal), which would later be rendered as Khajag by those around him. In 1883, after attaining his early education locally, he continued his higher education at the Gevorgian Seminary. Graduating  in 1886, Khajag became a teacher and for seven years taught in parochial schools in Baku, Akulis, and Ganja. During his time in Baku, Khajag joined the Armenian Revolutionary Federation (ARF). To further his education, Khajag went to Geneva, where he attended the University of Geneva and studied social sciences. While in Geneva, he began to contribute to the newspaper Droshak, an organ of the ARF.

Immediately after his graduation in 1898, Khajag was sent to the Balkans and then Alexandria by the editorial staff of Droshak. After staying in Alexandria for a year, he went to Izmir for six months and finally Constantinople, where he remained for two years.

Karekin Khajag was imprisoned for eight months due to revolutionary activity. He was then exiled to the Caucasus where he continued his work as a teacher. He became the principal of the Armenian school in Shushi for two years. After his marriage, Khajag settled in Tiflis in 1903 and became one of the editors of the Armenian newspaper Mshak. While working for the newspaper, he also taught on the side at the Nersisyan School. In 1906, he became one of the founding editors of the newspaper Harach, working alongside Avetis Aharonian and Yeghisheh Topjian.

In 1908 he was arrested and sent to prison, where he remained for six months. After being released, Khajag was arrested again and sent to prison nine months later.

After being released from prison in 1912, Khajag returned to Constantinople where he contributed to the local newspaper Azadamard, while becoming a principal of an Armenian school in the district of Samatya.

Death
Karekin Khajag was one of the Armenian leaders deported during the Armenian Genocide. On the night of 24 April 1915, Khajag was arrested and imprisoned in Constantinople, then sent via train to Ayaş, a village located in the interior provinces of the Ottoman Empire. Confined in a prison at Ayaş, Khajag along with Rupen Zartarian, Sarkis Minassian, Khachatur Malumian, Harutiun Jangülian, and Nazaret Daghavarian were to be transferred to Diyarbakir on 2 June. Ostensibly, they were to undergo a court-martial in Diyarbakir; however, Khajag along with the rest were murdered en route in the area of Karacur between Urfa and Severek (today Siverek). The order for the murder was given from Captain Şevket to Haci Onbaşı, a member of the Special Organization.

References

Bibliography

1867 births
1915 deaths
Armenian nationalists
People who died in the Armenian genocide
Armenian journalists
Armenian educators
Armenian Revolutionary Federation politicians
People from Gyumri
University of Geneva alumni
Armenian male writers